Rhys Lee is an Australian visual artist who lives in Aireys Inlet, Victoria, Australia. Coming from a background of street art, Rhys works in a range of media centring on painting with acrylics and oils. Rhys is represented by in a range of art collections that include the University of Queensland Art Museum.

He was a finalist in the Archibald Prize in 2012.

External links
Karen Woodbury Gallery, Melbourne, Australia
Artabase
The Vine

Year of birth missing (living people)
Living people
Australian painters